Vroman is an unincorporated community in Lincoln County, Nebraska, United States.

History
A post office was established at Vroman in 1887, and remained in operation until it was discontinued in 1903. The community was named for William Vroman, an early settler.

References

Unincorporated communities in Lincoln County, Nebraska
Unincorporated communities in Nebraska